Glyptotheque of the Croatian Academy of Sciences and Arts is an art gallery in the center of Zagreb, Croatia. It is located on Medvedgradska Street near Tkalčićeva Street within the Gornji Grad - Medveščak administrative district.

External links 

 

Art museums and galleries in Zagreb
Gornji Grad–Medveščak
Industrial buildings completed in 1864
Art museums established in 1937
1937 establishments in Croatia
Croatian sculpture